This is a list of alumni, former staff, and those otherwise associated with the National and Kapodistrian University of Athens. This list is not complete.

Heads of state or government
 Nicos Anastasiades (b. 1946), President of Cyprus (since 2013)
 Constantine II (1940–2023), King of the Hellenes (1964–1973)
 Panagiotis Kanellopoulos (1902–1986), Prime Minister of Greece (1945; 1967)
 Konstantinos Karamanlis (1907–1998), President of Greece (1980–1985; 1990–1995) and Prime Minister of Greece (1955–1958; 1958–1961; 1961–1963; 1974–1980)
 Kostas Karamanlis (b. 1956), Prime Minister of Greece (2004–2009)
 Spyros Markezinis (1909–2000), Prime Minister of Greece (1973)
 Konstantinos Mitsotakis (1918–2017), Prime Minister of Greece (1990–1993)
 Alexandros Papanastasiou (1876–1936), Prime Minister of Greece (1924; 1932)
 Andreas Papandreou (1919–1996), Prime Minister of Greece (1981–1989; 1993–1996)
 Georgios Papandreou (1888–1968), Prime Minister of Greece (1944–1945; 1963; 1964–1965)
 Karolos Papoulias (1929–2021), President of Greece (2005–2015)
 Georgios Rallis (1918–2006), Prime Minister of Greece (1980–1981)
 Ioannis Rallis (1878–1946), Prime Minister of Greece (1943–1944)
 Michail Stasinopoulos (1903–2002), President of Greece (1974–1975)
 Vassiliki Thanou-Christophilou (b. 1950), Prime Minister of Greece (2015) and President of the Court of Cassation (since 2015)
 Charilaos Trikoupis (1832–1896), Prime Minister of Greece (1875; 1878; 1880; 1882–1885; 1886–1890; 1892–1893; 1893–1895)
 Konstantinos Tsatsos (1899–1987), President of Greece (1975–1980)
 Eleftherios Venizelos (1864–1936), Prime Minister of Greece (1910–1915; 1915; 1917–1920; 1924; 1928–1932; 1932; 1933) and Prime Minister of the Cretan State (1910)
 Xenophon Zolotas (1904–2004), Prime Minister of Greece (1989–1990) and Governor of the Bank of Greece (1944–1945; 1955–1967; 1974–1981)

Politics and government

Greece
 Panagiotis Adraktas (b. 1948), New Democracy MP
 Georgios Alogoskoufis (b. 1955), Minister of the Economy and Finance (2004–2008)
 Sia Anagnostopoulou (b. 1959), Alternate Minister of Education, Research and Religious Affairs (since 2015)
 Dora Bakoyannis (b. 1954), Minister for Foreign Affairs (2006–2009) and Mayor of Athens (2003–2006)
 Thodoris Dritsas (b. 1947), Minister of Shipping and Island Policy (since 2015)
 Nikos Filis (b. 1960), Minister of Education, Research and Religious Affairs (since 2015)
 Fofi Gennimata (b. 1964), President of PASOK (since 2015)
 Giorgos Kaminis (b. 1954), Mayor of Athens (since 2010)
 Georgios Katrougalos (b. 1963), Minister of Labour, Social Insurance and Social Solidarity (since 2015)
 Giorgos Stathakis (b. 1953), Minister of Economy, Development and Tourism (since 2015)

World
 Kyriakos Mavronikolas (b. 1955), Cypriot Minister of Defence (2003–2006)
 Sotos Zackheos (b. 1950), Special Envoy of the President of Cyprus to Russia (since 2013)

Law and the judiciary
 Nikos Alivizatos (b. 1949), legal scholar and Minister of the Interior, Public Administration and Decentralization (2004)
 Basil Markesinis (b. 1944), legal scholar

Religion and theology

Greece
 Saint Nectarios of Aegina (1846–1920), Bishop of Pentapolis and Wonderworker of Aegina
 Chrysostomos Savvatos (b. 1961), Bishop of Messenia

Science, mathematics and medicine
 Ioannis Papadakis (1820-1876) mathematician, astronomer
 Vassilios Lakon (1831–1900), mathematician, Lakon’s Axioms
 Konstantinos M. Mitsopoulos (1844-1911), geologist
 John Hazzidakis (1844-1921), mathematician, Hazzidakis transform 
 Timoleon Argyropoulos (1847-1912), physicist
 Cyparissos Stephanos (1857-1917), mathematician, Desmic system
 Elly Agallidis (1914–2006), physicist/physical chemist
 Benediktos Adamantiades (1875–1962), ophthalmologist
 Andreas Anagnostakis (1827–1896), physician
 Constantin Carathéodory (1873–1950), mathematician
 Gerasimos Danilatos (b. 1946), physicist and inventor of the ESEM
 Sophia Frangou, psychiatrist
 Fotis Kafatos (1940–2017), biologist and President of the European Research Council (2005–2010)
 George Kollias (b. 1958), biologist
 Nikos Logothetis (b. 1950), neuroscientist
 Dimitri Nanopoulos (b. 1948), physicist
 Georgios Papanikolaou (1883–1962), doctor and inventor of the Pap test
 Iphigenia Photaki (1921–1983), organic chemist
 Irini Sereti, scientist, physician, and chief of the HIV pathogenesis section at the National Institute of Allergy and Infectious Diseases.
 Panayotis Varotsos (b. 1947), physicist
 Leonidas Zervas (1902–1980), organic chemist known for the Bergmann-Zervas synthesis

Philosophy, history and archaeology
 Helene Ahrweiler (b. 1926), Byzantinologist
 Manolis Andronikos (1919–1992), archaeologist
 Anna Apostolaki (1880-1968), archaeologist and museum curator
 Vladimir Beneshevich (1874–1938), historian
 Cornelius Castoriadis (1922–1997), philosopher
 Takis Fotopoulos (b. 1940), philosopher
 Emmanuel Kriaras (1906–2014), philologer
 Angeliki Laiou (1941–2008), Byzantinologist

Literature and journalism
 Stephanos Constantinides (born 1941), Cyprus, Canadian scholar
 Odysseas Elytis (1911–1996), poet and recipient of the 1979 Nobel Prize in Literature
 Nikos Engonopoulos (1903–1985), poet and painter
 Nikos Gatsos (1911–1992), poet and lyricist
 Kostas Karyotakis (1896–1928), poet
 Nikos Kazantzakis (1883–1957), writer
 Kostis Palamas (1859–1943), poet and co-founder of the New Athenian School
 Lefteris Papadopoulos (b. 1935), lyricist
 Giorgos Seferis (1900–1971), poet and recipient of the 1963 Nobel Prize in Literature
 Angelos Sikelianos (1884–1951), poet and playwright
 Stefanos Tassopoulos (1939-2013), poet and playwright
 Nanos Valaoritis (1921–2019), writer
 Kostas Varnalis (1884–1974), poet
 Dinesh Weerawansa (b. 1966), Editor-in-Chief of the Sri Lankan Sunday Observer (2006–2014)

Culture and sports
 Thanos Mikroutsikos (1947–2019), composer
 Lakis Nikolaou (b. 1949), footballer

Archaeology 

 Sofia Voutsaki, Bronze Age Aegean archaeologist

References

 
Alumni
Alumni